James Vincent O'Brien (24 July 1925 – 27 May 1988) was a Canadian sprinter. He competed in the 100 m and 4 × 100 m events at the 1948 Summer Olympics and finished fifth in the relay. Besides athletics O'Brien played hockey and Canadian football. He retired from competitions a few years after the 1948 Olympics.

Competition record

References

External links
 James O'Brien profile at Canadian Olympic Committee

1925 births
1988 deaths
Athletes from Toronto
Canadian male sprinters
Olympic track and field athletes of Canada
Athletes (track and field) at the 1948 Summer Olympics